Wuhu Xuanzhou Airport is an airport built to replace the commercial airline service of the old Wuhu Wanli Airport, and serves the cities of Wuhu and Xuancheng in Anhui Province, China. It began in June 2012, and it took four years to select the airport site from the original ten candidates. It received approval from the national government in 2016.

The airport opened on 30 April 2021.

Facilities
The airport has a  runway (class 4D), a  terminal building, and 8 aircraft parking aprons. It is projected to serve 1.2 million passengers and 5000 tons of cargo annually by 2025.

Airlines and destinations

See also
List of airports in China
List of the busiest airports in China

References

Airports in Anhui
Buildings and structures in Wuhu
Xuancheng
2021 establishments in China
Airports established in 2021